The ripidion, or hexapterygon is a ceremonial fan used in Eastern Christian worship.

In the Eastern Churches, liturgical fans have been used from the first centuries to the present day. A fan is generally made of metal, round, having the iconographic likeness of a six-winged seraphim and is set on the end of a pole. Fans of carved, gilded, or painted wood are also found. Fans are usually made in pairs.

Byzantine Rite

At ordination of a deacon

Upon ordination, a deacon is vested with a certain protocol for each vestment, and then with the same protocol is given a fan and "places himself by the Holy Table, and fans the Holy Things."

Fanning the gifts at the liturgy

Other uses

Fans are carried by the altar servers at all processions with Eucharistic gifts and the Gospel Book.; in the Russian tradition they are often also used to honour a particularly sacred icon or relic. When not in use, the fans are usually kept in stands behind the Holy Table, although in Slavic traditions they may be kept out of sight elsewhere in the altar, especially in northern Russia, where icons of Christ and the Theotokos are usually placed behind the Holy Table.

Other rites

Fans used in the Maronite and Oriental traditions are distinctive, having little hoops of metal or bells all around the circumference of the disks, symbolizing the hymns of the angels to God. At particularly solemn points of the liturgy, these are shaken gently to produce a tinkling and jingling sound, akin to the sound of multiple altar bells.

Further reading
Enhanced Strong's Lexicon, James Strong, Oak Harbor, WA, Logos Research Systems, 1995. (Αρ. λέξης 03742).
The Anchor Bible Dictionary, Freedman, David Noel, New York, Doubleday, 1997/1992.
Pseudo-Dionysius Areopagita, De coelesti hierarchia, [Patristische Texte und Studien 36. Berlin: De Gruyter, 1991]

Εγκυκλοπαίδεια, «Πάπυρος, Larousse, Britannica», Εκδόσεις Πάπυρος, Αθήνα, 1976/2006
Catholic Encyclopedia
Ο κόσμος των αγγέλων Αρχιμανδρίτου Ιωάννου Καραμούζη

Footnotes

References

Eastern Orthodox liturgy
Eastern Christian liturgical objects